In mathematics, Belyi's theorem on algebraic curves states that any non-singular algebraic curve C, defined by algebraic number coefficients, represents a compact Riemann surface which is a ramified covering of the Riemann sphere, ramified at three points only.

This is a result of G. V. Belyi from 1979.  At the time it was considered surprising, and it spurred Grothendieck to develop his theory of dessins d'enfant, which describes non-singular algebraic curves over the algebraic numbers using combinatorial data.

Quotients of the upper half-plane 
It follows that the Riemann surface in question can be taken to be the quotient

H/Γ

(where H is the upper half-plane and Γ is a subgroup of finite index in the modular group) compactified by cusps. Since the modular group has non-congruence subgroups, it is not the conclusion that any such curve is a modular curve.

Belyi functions 
A Belyi function is a holomorphic map from a compact Riemann surface S to the complex projective line P1(C) ramified only over three points, which after a Möbius transformation may be taken to be . Belyi functions may be described combinatorially by dessins d'enfants.

Belyi functions and dessins d'enfants – but not Belyi's theorem – date at least to the work of Felix Klein; he used them in his article  to study an 11-fold cover of the complex projective line with monodromy group PSL(2,11).

Applications 
Belyi's theorem is an existence theorem for Belyi functions, and has subsequently been much used in the inverse Galois problem.

References

Further reading 
 
 

Algebraic curves
Theorems in algebraic geometry